Xylotrupes is a genus of rhinoceros beetles, with more than 25 species and subspecies distributed worldwide, but especially in Asia.

Species
 Xylotrupes australicus J. Thomson, 1859 - Australia
 Xylotrupes baumeisteri Schaufuss, 1885 - Sulawesi, status unclear
 Xylotrupes beckeri Schaufuss, 1885 - West Malaysia, Sumatra
 Xylotrupes carinulus Rowland, 2011 - New Guinea, Aru Islands Regency
 Xylotrupes clinias Schaufuss, 1885 - Sulawesi, Maluku Islands
 Xylotrupes damarensis Rowland, 2006 - Tanimbar Islands
 Xylotrupes faber Silvestre, 2002 - Java
 Xylotrupes falcatus Minck, 1920 - Indonesia
 Xylotrupes florensis Lansberge, 1879 - lesser Sunda islands (= Endebius florensis), Flores, Timor and Wetar
 Xylotrupes gideon (Linnaeus, 1767) - widespread
 Xylotrupes gilleti - Tanimbar islands
 Xylotrupes inarmatus Sternberg, 1906 - Java
 Xylotrupes introduce Li, 2016 - lesser Sunda islands
 Xylotrupes lorquini Schaufuss, 1885 - Sulawesi
 Xylotrupes lumawigi Silvestre, 2002 - Philippines
 Xylotrupes macleayi Montrouzier, 1855 - New Guinea & Vanuatu
 Xylotrupes meridionalis Prell, 1914 - Sri Lanka
 (Xylotrupes mindanaoensis Schultze, 1920) - should probably be placed in the genus Allomyrina
 Xylotrupes mniszechi J. Thomson, 1859 - Himalayas
 Xylotrupes oudomxayicus Li, 2016 - Laos
 Xylotrupes pachycera Rowland, 2006 - Borneo
 Xylotrupes pauliani Silvestre, 1997 - Sumatra and West Malaysia Pahang
 Xylotrupes philippinensis Endrödi, 1957 - Philippines & Lanyu, Taiwan
 Xylotrupes pubescens Waterhouse, 1841 – Philippines
 Xylotrupes reductus Walker, 1859 - Sri Lanka
 Xylotrupes rindaae Fujii, 2011 - Indonesia
 Xylotrupes siamensis Minck, 1920 - SE-Asia
 Xylotrupes socrates Schaufuss, 1864 - Vietnam, Thailand
 (Xylotrupes solidipes Walker, 1859) - should probably be placed in the genus Dipelicus (Pentodontini)
 Xylotrupes striatopunctatus Silvestre, 2003 - Maluku Islands
 Xylotrupes sumatrensis Minck, 1920 - Sumatra and West Malaysia
 Xylotrupes tadoana Rowland, 2006 - Flores
 Xylotrupes taprobanus Prell, 1914 - India, Sri Lanka
 Xylotrupes telemachos Rowland, 2003 - Maluku Islands
 Xylotrupes ulysses (Guérin-Méneville, 1830) - Bismarck Archipelago
 Xylotrupes wiltrudae Silvestre, 1997 - Borneo

References

External links
 

Dynastinae